Joseph Patrick "J.P." Compretta (born March 17, 1945) is a Mississippi lawyer and Democratic politician. He is a former member of the Mississippi House of Representatives, representing the 122nd house district (part of Hancock County). Compretta was Speaker Pro Tempore of the House and Chairman of the Management Committee, also serving on the Judiciary, Marine Resources and Ways & Means committees.

Background 
Compretta was born March 17, 1945, in Fort Lauderdale, Florida. He attended Pearl River Junior College, the University of Southern Mississippi and the Mississippi College School of Law. He worked as a lawyer, and served as County Prosecutor, City Prosecutor and Assistant District Attorney before being elected to the House in 1975.

Service in the House of Representatives 
Compretta was first elected to the House in 1975. He served two terms (1976–1984). He was then elected again in 1987, and was re-elected until stepping down before the 2011 election. He was succeeded by fellow Democrat David Baria.

Personal life 
He is married to the former Kay Dorich; they live in Bay St. Louis. Their son, Joseph Jr., known as "Jody", was crushed by a Mardi Gras parade float in February 2008. Compretta is an Episcopalian.

References

External links 
Mississippi House of Representatives page for J.P. Compretta
Biography at Project Vote Smart
2009 campaign contributors

1945 births
Living people
Politicians from Fort Lauderdale, Florida
Democratic Party members of the Mississippi House of Representatives
Mississippi lawyers
People from Bay St. Louis, Mississippi
Pearl River Community College alumni
Mississippi College School of Law alumni
21st-century American politicians